Honey is an album by Ray Conniff and The Singers. It was released in 1968 on the Columbia label (catalog no. CS-9661).

The album debuted on Billboard magazine's "Top LPs" chart on July 27, 1968, peaked at No. 22, and remained on that chart for nine weeks. It was certified by the RIAA as a gold record. It was also Conniff's last album to make the Top 40 on the Billboard album chart.

AllMusic later gave the album a rating of three stars. Reviewer William Ruhlmann wrote: "Fans of the original songs may have found the results disconcerting on occasion, but Conniff was aiming at a less-discerning audience that could have hummed along when hearing the songs on the radio without paying close attention to the words."

Track listing
Side 1
 "Honey (I Miss You)" (B. Russell)
 "I Say A Little Prayer" (B. Bacharach, H. David)
 "The Look Of Love" (From "Casino Royale") (B. Bacharach, H. David)
 "Love Is Blue (L'Amour Est Bleu)" (B. Blackburn, A. Popp, P. Cour)
 "Kiss Me Goodbye" (B. Mason, L. Reed)

Side 2
 "Gentle On My Mind" (J. Hartford)
 "By The Time I Get To Phoenix" (J. Webb)
 "Spanish Eyes" (B. Kaempfert, C. Singleton, E. Snyder)
 Theme From "Valley Of The Dolls" (A. Previn, D. Previn)
 "Sounds Of Silence" (P. Simon)
 "Goin' Out Of My Head" (B. Weinstein, T. Randazzo)

References

1968 albums
Columbia Records albums
Ray Conniff albums